"Don't We All Have the Right" is a song written and recorded by Roger Miller in 1970 and featured on his album, Trip in the Country, released as a double A-side with "South." It was later recorded by Ricky Van Shelton. It was first the b-side to his second single "Crime of Passion" before it served as the fifth and last single released from his debut album, Wild-Eyed Dream in 1988. The song was Shelton's 3rd #1 hit on the Billboard Hot Country Singles & Tracks (now Hot Country Songs) chart as well as his third consecutive #1.

Content
The narrator finds out he's wrong when he thinks his lover will return after leaving him.

Chart performance
"Don't We All Have the Right" reached #1 on the Billboard Hot Country Songs chart and on The Canadian RPM Country Tracks chart. His second single to do so.

Weekly charts

Year-end charts

References

1988 singles
1970 songs
Roger Miller songs
Ricky Van Shelton songs
Songs written by Roger Miller
Song recordings produced by Steve Buckingham (record producer)
Columbia Records singles